The 1975–76 season was the 96th season of competitive football in England.

Diary of the season

16 August 1975: The First Division season begins with reigning champions Derby County held to a 1–1 draw by Sheffield United. Last season's Second Division champions Manchester United win 2–0 away to Wolverhampton Wanderers, while Queens Park Rangers beat Liverpool 2–0.

23 August 1975: Derby County are beaten 5–1 by Queens Park Rangers at the Baseball Ground in their first home League match of the season.

31 August 1975: Manchester United lead the First Division by one point from West Ham United at the end of August.

30 September 1975: Two London clubs, Queens Park Rangers and West Ham United, lead the First Division table at the end of September, a point ahead of Manchester United. Sheffield United are bottom with just three points from ten matches.

30 October 1975: England lose 2–1 to Czechoslovakia in Bratislava in a European Championship qualifier.

31 October 1975: Seven clubs all lie within two points at the top of the First Division, with the table led by Queens Park Rangers, Manchester United and West Ham United. Sheffield United are already five points adrift of Wolverhampton Wanderers at the bottom, while Leicester City are still looking for their first win, having drawn nine of their fourteen games so far.

8 November 1975: Manchester United fall from first place to third after the Red Devils were beaten by Liverpool. The new league leaders are West Ham United, with second-placed Derby level on points with the London club. Elsewhere, braces from Leeds United's Duncan McKenzie and Colin Bell of Manchester City help their clubs beat Newcastle United and Birmingham City respectively.

12 November 1975: Manchester City thrash neighbours United 4–0 in the fourth round of the Football League Cup.

19 November 1975: England draw 1–1 away to Portugal in their last European Championship qualifier, and must now hope that Czechoslovakia fail to beat Cyprus in order to qualify for the quarter-finals.

23 November 1975: Czechoslovakia beat Cyprus 3–0 to confirm England's elimination from the European Championships.

30 November 1975: The month ends with Derby County having recovered from their poor start to top the First Division table. They lead Queens Park Rangers and West Ham United by one point. Sheffield United have been joined by Birmingham City and Burnley in the relegation zone.

20 December 1975: Liverpool avenge their opening day defeat to Queens Park Rangers by beating them 2–0 at Anfield in a top-of-the-table clash.

31 December 1975: The year ends with Liverpool and Manchester United level on points at the top of the table, one point ahead of Leeds United and Derby County. Sheffield United are now eleven points from safety, and Wolverhampton Wanderers and Burnley complete the bottom three. Arsenal are struggling in seventeenth place.

3 January 1976: FA Cup third round day throws up a set of interesting results: table toppers Liverpool eliminate reigning FA Cup winners West Ham, Manchester City hit Hartlepool United for six and two late goals for Isthmian League outfit Tooting & Mitcham United help them force a replay against Swindon Town.

17 January 1976: Stoke City play a league game at Port Vale's Vale Park ground during repair work to the roof of the Butler Street Stand at the Victoria Ground, after it had been blown off during severe winds a fortnight earlier.

24 January 1976: Substitute Roger Davies' goal sees Derby County beat Liverpool in the FA Cup fourth round; the Rams' reward is a tie against Southend United, victors over Cardiff City. Other qualifiers to round five include Division Three club Crystal Palace, who overcame Leeds–currently second in the First Division table–at Elland Road, and Fourth Divisioners Bradford City, responsible for ending the FA Cup campaign of Tooting & Mitcham, the last remaining non-Leaguers. The sole First Division match was a London derby between QPR and West Ham: Alan Taylor scoring the only goal for the Hammers.

31 January 1976: Liverpool thrash West Ham United 4–0 at Upton Park but trail Manchester United by a point at the top of the table. Derby County, Leeds United and Queens Park Rangers also remain in contention.

28 February 1976: Manchester City beat Newcastle United 2–1 in the League Cup final.

29 February 1976: The race for the title remains extremely close, with Liverpool, Queens Park Rangers and Manchester United tied on points at the top, and Derby County just one point behind. Leeds United trail by five points, but have at least two games in hand on each of their rivals. At the bottom, Sheffield United are ten points from safety, and Wolverhampton Wanderers, Burnley and Birmingham City appear to be fighting to avoid the other two relegation places.

6 March 1976: Third Division Crystal Palace reach the FA Cup semi-finals by beating Sunderland 1–0 at Roker Park. Fourth Division giant-killers Bradford City lose 1–0 at home to Southampton, and Derby County beat Newcastle United 4–2.

27 March 1976: Sheffield United are beaten 5–0 by Tottenham Hotspur and are relegated to the Second Division.

31 March 1976: Unbeaten in the League since January, Queens Park Rangers lead the First Division by a point from Manchester United and Derby County with five games remaining. Liverpool are two points behind the leaders, but they and United have a game in hand.

3 April 1976: Manchester United and Southampton reach the FA Cup final after 2–0 victories over Derby County and Crystal Palace respectively.

8 April 1976: Malcolm Macdonald's brace helps Newcastle United beat beleaguered Birmingham City 4–0.

10 April 1976: Derby County's bid to retain their League title is effectively ended when they lose 4–3 to Manchester City. Queens Park Rangers beat Middlesbrough 4–2 and have now taken 23 points from the last 24 available. They are now in control of the championship race, as Manchester United lose 3–0 at Ipswich Town and Liverpool draw 0–0 against Aston Villa.

17 April 1976: Liverpool move back to the top of the First Division after they beat Stoke City 5–3 and Queens Park Rangers suffer a 3–2 defeat to Norwich City.

19 April 1976: Burnley are relegated to the Second Division with one match of the season remaining.

21 April 1976: Manchester United's bid for the double is virtually ended by a 1–0 loss to Stoke City, their first home League defeat of the season.

24 April 1976: Queens Park Rangers end the best League season in the club's history by beating Leeds United 2–0. They are a point ahead of Liverpool, and need the Reds to lose their last match of the season to win the championship.

28 April 1976: Liverpool recover from 2–0 down to beat Club Bruges 3–2 in the first leg of the UEFA Cup final at Anfield.

1 May 1976: Southampton cause a major shock by beating Manchester United 1–0 in the FA Cup final thanks to a second-half goal from Bobby Stokes. They emulate Sunderland's 1973 feat of winning the Cup from the Second Division.

4 May 1976: Liverpool come from a goal down to beat Wolverhampton Wanderers 3–1 and win the League title. They finish a point ahead of Queens Park Rangers and four ahead of Manchester United. The defeat condemns Wolves to relegation alongside Sheffield United and Burnley.

5 May 1976: West Ham United lose 4–2 to Anderlecht in the European Cup Winners' Cup final at the Heysel Stadium in Brussels.

15 May 1976: England lose 2–1 to Scotland at Hampden Park in their last Home Championship match. Kenny Dalglish scores the winning goal when his shot goes between the legs of England goalkeeper Ray Clemence.

19 May 1976: Liverpool claim their second European trophy by drawing 1–1 with Club Bruges to complete a 4–3 aggregate victory in the UEFA Cup final.

28 May 1976: England come from two goals down at half-time to beat Italy 3–2 in New York City in a tournament organised to commemorate the bicentenary of the independence of the USA.

13 June 1976: England beat Finland 4–1 in their first qualifying match for the 1978 World Cup.

UEFA Competitions

Liverpool won the UEFA Cup for the second time after a 4–3 aggregate victory over Club Bruges in the final. The 1975 FA Cup winners West Ham United reached the final of the European Cup Winners' Cup, where they lost 4–2 to another Belgian side, Anderlecht. League champions Derby County lost 6–5 on aggregate to Real Madrid in the second round of the European Cup.

FA Cup

Southampton pulled off one of the greatest upsets in the history of FA Cup finals when a Bobby Stokes goal gave them victory over Manchester United at Wembley. It was the first major trophy in the club's history. Crystal Palace of the Third Division had an inspired run from the first round through to the semi-finals, beating Leeds United, Chelsea and Sunderland along the way, all of whom were in higher divisions.

League Cup

Manchester City beat Newcastle to claim the League Cup, their first major trophy for six years.
Dennis Tueart scored a brilliant overhead kick to win the game.

Football League

First Division
Liverpool won the First Division title and the UEFA Cup in their second season under the management of Bob Paisley. They finished just one point ahead of Queens Park Rangers, who had emerged as serious title contenders under the management Dave Sexton, who had won silverware with Chelsea a few seasons earlier. Manchester United enjoyed a strong First Division comeback by finishing third. Derby County's defence of the league title finished with a fourth-place finish. Leeds United continued to recover from the departure of Don Revie by moving up to fifth place a year after finishing ninth.

FA Cup holders West Ham United could only manage an 18th-place finish in the league, and were runners-up in the European Cup Winners' Cup.

Sheffield United's terrible season saw them relegated in bottom place after five years back in the First Division. They went down with Burnley and Wolves.

Bertie Mee, 57, retired after ten years as manager of Arsenal. The highlights of his career had been the Inter-Cities Fairs Cup triumph of 1970 and the Double win of 1971, but Arsenal had fallen behind the best in recent seasons and Mee handed over the reins to Terry Neill.

Second Division
Three years after their famous FA Cup win, Sunderland finally made it out of the Second Division as champions. Bristol City finished runners-up to end their 65-year exile from the First Division. Johnny Giles enjoyed a dream start to his managerial career by ending West Bromwich Albion's three-year stay in the Second Division. Bolton Wanderers missed out on promotion by a single point under Ian Greaves. Sixth placed Southampton won the first silverware of their history by winning the FA Cup at the expense of Manchester United.

Nottingham Forest finished eighth in Brian Clough's first full season as manager. Chelsea finished a disappointing 11th in their first season outside the top flight for over a decade.

Portsmouth, York City and Oxford United finished the season relegated to the Third Division.

Third Division
Hereford United won the Third Division title and with it promotion to the Second Division in only their fourth season in the Football League. Cardiff City and Millwall went up with them to seal an instant return to the Second Division. Brighton, managed by Brian Clough's former assistant Peter Taylor, missed out on promotion by one place. Crystal Palace, semi-finalists in the FA Cup, missed out on promotion after a late season collapse in form, which was followed by the replacement of Malcolm Allison as manager with Terry Venables.

Halifax, Southend, Colchester and Aldershot were relegated. Narrowly avoiding the drop were Sheffield Wednesday, who during the interwar years had won the League championship and the FA Cup, and which resulted in their lowest League finish ever.

Fourth Division
32-year-old Graham Taylor achieved the first success of his managerial career by winning the Fourth Division title for Lincoln City. He was linked with several job vacancies in the First and Second Divisions but surprised everyone by taking over at Elton John's Watford, who were still in the Fourth Division. Joining Lincoln in the Third Division were Northampton Town, Reading and Tranmere Rovers.

The Football League voted in favour of the bottom four clubs remaining in the Fourth Division, and so there were no departures or arrivals in the league for 1976–77.

Top goalscorers

First Division
Ted MacDougall (Norwich City) – 23 goals

Second Division
Derek Hales (Charlton Athletic) – 28 goals

Third Division
Dixie McNeil (Hereford United) – 35 goals

Fourth Division
Ronnie Moore (Tranmere Rovers) – 34 goals

Non-league football

Star players
Tottenham Hotpsur goalkeeper Pat Jennings was credited with the PFA Players' Player of the Year award.
Liverpool striker Kevin Keegan was voted FWA Footballer of the Year.
Manchester City winger Peter Barnes added the PFA Young Player of the Year award to his League Cup winners medal.
Southampton striker Bobby Stokes inspired his side to their first ever major trophy by scoring the winning goal in the FA Cup final against Manchester United.
Manchester United's young winger Steve Coppell showed immense promise after helping his newly promoted employers reach third place in the league and reach the FA Cup final.
Arsenal gave a debut to 17-year-old defender David O'Leary who went on to make 30 appearances that season on the way to a club record of 722 in a 17-year career with the club.

Star managers
Bob Paisley won his first two trophies as Liverpool manager – the League championship and UEFA Cup – and he would pile up many more prizes over the next seven seasons.
Lawrie McMenemy guided Southampton to their first major trophy, beating favourites Manchester United in the FA Cup final.
Dave Sexton guided Queens Park Rangers to the club's best finish of second in the league.
Tommy Docherty built an exciting young side at Manchester United and a year after promotion back to the First Division they finished third in the league and reached the FA Cup final.
Bob Stokoe led Sunderland into the First Division, three years after they won the FA Cup.

References